Davy Crockett Lake is an  body of water located on Tennessee State Route 152 in Crockett County in the U.S. state of Tennessee. It was originally named Humboldt Lake. It is a fishing lake home to catfish and largemouth bass.

References

Reservoirs in Tennessee
Davy Crockett
Bodies of water of Crockett County, Tennessee